Demirköy may refer to the following places in Turkey:
Demirköy, Kırklareli, a town and a district in Kırklareli Province
Demirköy, Lalapaşa, a town or village in District of Lalapaşa, Edirne Province
Demirköy, Nallıhan, a village in District of Nallıhan, Ankara Province
Demirköy, Pazaryeri, a village in District of Pazaryeri, Bilecik Province
Demirköy, Yusufeli, a village in Yusufeli District, Artvin Province